HMS Bee was an  of the Royal Navy, launched on 8 December 1915. This class are also known as "Large China Gunboats".

Initially built for service on the River Danube, after World War I the Insects were transported to China and served on the Yangtze River. In 1920, Bee became the flagship of the Yangtze patrol.

Ladybird took six shells and Bee dodged a shell as she came upon the scene.

Bee was paid off in 1938 when the gunboat , the new flagship, arrived. She was sold in Shanghai for scrap on 22 March 1939 for £5,225.

External links
 History of Yangtze River Patrol

 

Insect-class gunboats
1915 ships